This is a list of places on the Victorian Heritage Register in the City of Kingston in Victoria, Australia. The Victorian Heritage Register is maintained by the Heritage Council of Victoria.

The Victorian Heritage Register, as of 2020, lists the following eight state-registered places within the City of Kingston:

References

Kingston
City of Kingston (Victoria)